The Madness of Many is the fourth studio album by American instrumental progressive metal band Animals as Leaders. It was released on November 11, 2016.

Track listing

Personnel
Animals as Leaders
 Tosin Abasi – guitars
 Javier Reyes – guitars, bass
 Matt Garstka – drums

Guest musicians
 Travis Stewart AKA "Machinedrum" – electronics/synths ("Inner Assassins")

Production
 Animals as Leaders – production
 Francesco Camelli – drum recording
 Ermin Hamidovic – mastering
 Javier Reyes – mixing
 Ash Avildsen & Nick Walters – A&R
 Dario Veruari – album artwork
 Daniel McBride – layout

Charts

References

2016 albums
Animals as Leaders albums
Sumerian Records albums